Emil Attila Szolomajer (born 24 January 1974) is a Romanian former football goalkeeper. In his career Szolomajer played for teams such as Baia Mare, CSM Reșița, and Universitatea Cluj. After retirement he started to work as a goalkeeping coach.

Trivia
In Liga I, Szolomajer played 10 games for FC Baia Mare during the 1994–95 season, one of them as a substitute. In those 10 games, the opponents scored 40 goals against FC Baia Mare.

External links

1974 births
Living people
People from Sighetu Marmației
Romanian footballers
Association football goalkeepers
Liga I players
Liga II players
CS Minaur Baia Mare (football) players
CSM Reșița players
FC Universitatea Cluj players
ACS Sticla Arieșul Turda players
CSM Câmpia Turzii players